Creach-Beinn (698 m) is a mountain in the south of the Isle of Mull, Scotland. It rises above the northern shore of Loch Spelve.

A rocky mountain with good views from its summit, Creach-Beinn is usually climbed from the settlement of Lochbuie.

References

Mountains and hills of Argyll and Bute
Mountains and hills of the Scottish islands
Marilyns of Scotland
Grahams
Landforms of the Isle of Mull